10K Projects (also known as Ten Thousand Projects) is an American independent record label founded in 2016. Distribution is handled by Virgin Music Label & Artist Services, a division of Universal Music Group.

History
10K Projects was founded by Elliot Grainge in 2016. Elliot Grainge is the son of Lucian Grainge, chairman and CEO of Universal Music Group.

Artists 
 Trippie Redd
 C Lanski
 Iann Dior
 Surfaces
 COIN
 Peach Tree Rascals
 Poorstacy
 Salem Ilese
 SXMPRA
 Leah Kate
 Ice Spice (10K Projects/Capitol)
 Summrs
 Rich Amiri
 JELEEL!
 Dro Kenji
 Internet Money
 Showjoe
 Kenzo Balla
 TG Crippy
 Rot Ken
 6ix9ine
 WizTheMc

External links
 10K Projects on AllMusic

References

American record labels